Dongfeng Motor Group Co., Ltd. known also as DFG is a Chinese holding company based in Wuhan, Hubei. Its H shares were listed on the Hong Kong stock exchange.

Dongfeng Motor Group formed several joint ventures with other foreign automobile makers, namely Luxgen, Honda, Renault-Nissan and Stellantis (which created by the merger of Fiat Chrysler Automobiles and Groupe PSA). It also leased several trademarks from the parent company Dongfeng Motor Corporation since 2005.

Dongfeng Motor Group was ranked 550th in 2017 Forbes Global 2000 List. , the market capitalization of its H shares (about 33.15% of total share capital) was HK$24.931 billion.

History
Dongfeng Motor Group (then known as Dongfeng Motor Co., Ltd.) was incorporated on 18 May 2001 as a special purpose vehicle for debt-to-equity swap of Dongfeng Motor Corporation. The other shareholders were fellow state-owned financial companies China Huarong Asset Management, China Cinda Asset Management, China Orient Asset Management, China Great Wall Asset Management and China Development Bank for a total of 42.86% stake. In 2003, [new] Dongfeng Motor Co., Ltd. was incorporated as a joint venture of Dongfeng Motor Group and Nissan. Dongfeng Motor Group, at that time still known as [old] Dongfeng Motor Co., Ltd., was renamed to Dongfeng Automobile Industry Investment.

It also became a "company limited by shares" (analog of public limited company) in October 2004, with a new name Dongfeng Motor Group. The company issued H share and became a listed company on 7 December 2005.

In 2014 the plan to establish Dongfeng Commercial Vehicle was approved by the National Development and Reform Commission. It would acquire some business and assets from the joint venture Dongfeng Motor Co., Ltd. In turn Volvo acquired 45% stake of Dongfeng Commercial Vehicle from Dongfeng Motor Group. At the same time Dongfeng Nissan Diesel Motor would be a wholly owned subsidiary of Dongfeng Commercial Vehicle. In January 2015, Dongfeng Commercial Vehicle was established.

Subsidiaries

 Dongfeng (Wuhan) Engineering Consulting
 Dongfeng Motor Investment (Shanghai)
 Dongfeng Getrag Automobile Transmission
 Honda Motor (China) Investment

Divisions

 Dongfeng Passenger Vehicle Company
 Dongfeng Research & Development Centre

Joint ventures

 Dongfeng Motor Co., Ltd. (50%)
 Zhengzhou Nissan Automobile (79.65%)
 Dongfeng Automobile Co., Ltd. (60.1%)
 Dongfeng Cummins Engine (50%)
 Dongfeng Honda Automobile (50%)
 Dongfeng Honda Engine (50%)
 Dongfeng Honda Auto Parts (44%)
 Dongfeng Peugeot-Citroën Automobile (50%)
 Dongfeng Peugeot-Citroën Finance (50%)
 Dongfeng Renault Automobile (50%)
Dongfeng Daewoo ECC (50%)
Dongfeng Ajin Industrial Co., Ltd. (50%)

Equity interests

 Dongfeng Nissan Auto Finance (35%)
 Stellantis (3.17%)
 Wuhan Lear-DFM Auto Electric (25%)

Shareholders
, Dongfeng Motor Corporation is the largest shareholder for 66.86% shares. It was followed by Standard Chartered (2.81%), Prudential plc (2.64%), BlackRock (2.00%) and Edinburgh Partners (1.78%), all were H share owners and acted as investment managers (trustees).

References

External links
 

Companies formerly in the Hang Seng China Enterprises Index
Car manufacturers of China
Dongfeng Motor divisions and subsidiaries
Companies listed on the Hong Kong Stock Exchange
H shares
Truck manufacturers of China